Nassarius tangaroai is a species of sea snail, a marine gastropod mollusc in the family Nassariidae, the Nassa mud snails or dog whelks.

Description

Distribution
This species occurs in the Pacific Ocean off the Marquesas.

References

 Bouchet, P.; Fontaine, B. (2009). List of new marine species described between 2002–2006. Census of Marine Life. [

Nassariidae
Gastropods described in 2006